Greater Than One is the fifth studio album by American musician Dwele. It was released on August 28, 2012, via RT Music Group/eOne Music. Production was mainly handled by Dwele himself, in addition to Mike City, G-1, Prince "BikMagic" Damons and Rek. It features guest appearances from Monica Blaire, Black Milk, J. Tait, L'Renee and Raheem DeVaughn. The album peaked at number 30 on the Billboard 200 and number 9 on the Top R&B/Hip-Hop Albums, selling 11,000 copies in its first week of sales.

Track listing

Personnel
 Andwele "Dwele" Gardner – vocals, producer (tracks: 1–4, 6, 8–10, 13)
 Raheem DeVaughn – vocals (track 4)
 Curtis "Black Milk" Cross – vocals (track 8)
 James Tait – vocals (track 8)
 L'Renee – vocals (track 8)
 Blaire White – vocals (tracks: 9, 10)
 Michael "Mike City" Flowers – producer & arranger (tracks: 5, 11)
 Prince "BikMagic" Damons – producer (track 7)
 George "G-One" Archie – producer (track 12)
 Rek – producer (track 12)
 Todd Fairall – mixing
 Ronald "Ron E." Estill – mixing
 Eric Morgeson – mastering

Charts

References

2012 albums
Dwele albums
E1 Music albums
MNRK Music Group albums
Albums produced by G-One
Albums produced by Mike City